Isan (sometimes written isan or ISAN) are an English electronic music duo.  The name was initially explained as Integrated Services Analogue Network - a play on ISDN, reflecting their preference for analogue synthesisers.

Robin Saville and Antony Ryan met in Leicester in 1996, and have released several singles and albums since then, mainly for Morr Music.  Saville now lives in Leiston and Ryan, who is also part of Seavault, in Fredericia, Denmark - since the band's inception, the two musicians have lived in different parts of Europe, working separately and collaborating using the internet.

Discography

Albums

Single

 Trois Gymnopedies  (7") (Morr, 2006)

Remixes
 Int (Arc Mix) on Refract!ons (CD on Disasters by Choice Records) Layer remix 2005
 Underwater (7") Televise remix (2007)

External links
 Official band website
 Morr Music
 

British electronic music groups
Media containing Gymnopedies
Morr Music artists
Darla Records artists